Q0 may refer to:
 a graphics file format with extension .q0
 Q0, a formulation of higher-order typed logic in mathematics
 a variable used in a digital counter